The Sossus gecko (Pachydactylus etultra) is a species of lizard in the family Gekkonidae. It is endemic to Namibia.

References

Endemic fauna of Namibia
Pachydactylus
Reptiles described in 2011
Reptiles of Namibia
Taxa named by William Roy Branch